Palace of the End is a docudrama play by Judith Thompson, that consists of three monologues telling real-life tales of Iraq before and after the 2003 invasion of Iraq. The title is taken from Saddam Hussein’s former royal palace that housed torture chambers. Palace of the End was published in 2007 by Playwrights Canada Press.

The monologues
The monologue’s titles are "My Pyramids", "Harrowdown Hill", and "Instruments of Yearning".

“My Pyramids” refers to the Abu Ghraib human pyramids. The speaker is Lynndie England, the United States Army reservist who become the face of the Abu Ghraib torture and prisoner abuse, and who is said to have made prisoners form human pyramids.

"Harrowdown Hill" refers to the place where the body of Dr. David Kelly was found a few weeks after he confessed to a journalist that he had lied about the existence of weapons of mass destruction in Iraq. Kelly was the British weapons inspector in Iraq.

"Instruments of Yearning" are the Jihaz al-Haneen, the secret police of the Ba'ath Party who detained Nehrjas Al Saffarh, an Iraqi mother, when she was pregnant in 1963. Saffarh survived Saddam’s secret police but was killed during United States bombing in the 1991 Persian Gulf War.

External links
Palace of the End Review – Canadian Literature – A Quarterly of Criticism and Review
From Hell – Judith Thompson’s new play finds scapegoats and heroes in Iraq – CBC News – January 16, 2008
 Interview with Judith Thompson – February, 2004

See also
David Kelly
Iraq Dossier

References

Plays by Judith Thompson